John Frederick Shaw (1886 – 1916) was an English professional footballer who played as a forward for Sunderland.

References

1886 births
1916 deaths
Footballers from Sunderland
English footballers
Association football forwards
Darlington F.C. players
Sunderland A.F.C. players
Wallsend F.C. players
Leyton Orient F.C. players
Barrow A.F.C. players
English Football League players
Date of birth missing
Date of death missing